Wimberley Independent School District is a public school district based in Wimberley, Texas, United States.   In addition to most of Wimberley, the district serves the city of Woodcreek. In addition to Hays County, it extends into Comal County.

The district was formed on July 1, 1986, from portions of the Hays Consolidated and Dripping Springs districts.

In 2011, the school district was rated "Recognized" by the Texas Education Agency.

Schools
Wimberley High School (Grades 9–12)
Danforth Junior High School (Grades 6–8)
Jacob's Well Elementary School (Grades 2–5)
Scudder Primary School (Grades PK-1)

References

External links
Wimberley ISD

School districts in Hays County, Texas
School districts in Comal County, Texas
1986 establishments in Texas
School districts established in 1986